Nolan Flemmer (28 February 1938 – 22 January 2018) was a South African cricketer. He played in four first-class matches for Border in 1962/63.

See also
 List of Border representative cricketers

References

External links
 

1938 births
2018 deaths
South African cricketers
Border cricketers
Cricketers from East London, Eastern Cape